Heteroderinae is a subfamily of roundworms.

References

Tylenchida
Protostome subfamilies